This is an incomplete list of medium wave transmitters in Europe

Active stations

Former stations 
Those are former prominent AM transmitters:

See also
 MW DX

References

European medium wave transmitters
Radio frequency propagation

de:Mittelwelle